Clinton Township is one of the fifteen townships of Seneca County, Ohio, United States. It is also the most populated township in the county. The 2010 census found 4,109 people in the township.

Geography
Located in the center of the county, it borders the following townships:
Pleasant Township - north
Adams Township - northeast corner
Scipio Township - east
Bloom Township - southeast corner
Eden Township - south
Seneca Township - southwest corner
Hopewell Township - west
Liberty Township - northwest corner

Name and history
Clinton Township was organized in 1820. It was named for DeWitt Clinton, 6th Governor of New York.

It is one of seven Clinton Townships statewide.

Government
The township is governed by a three-member board of trustees, who are elected in November of odd-numbered years to a four-year term beginning on the following January 1. Two are elected in the year after the presidential election and one is elected in the year before it. There is also an elected township fiscal officer, who serves a four-year term beginning on April 1 of the year after the election, which is held in November of the year before the presidential election. Vacancies in the fiscal officership or on the board of trustees are filled by the remaining trustees.

References

External links
County website

Townships in Seneca County, Ohio
Townships in Ohio